Rzewuski may refer to:

People:
Henryk Rzewuski (1791–1866), Polish Romantic-era journalist and novelist
Seweryn Rzewuski (1743–1811), Polish-Lithuanian szlachcic
Stanisław Ferdynand Rzewuski (1737–1786), Polish noble (szlachcic)
Stanisław Mateusz Rzewuski (1642–1728), Polish noble (szlachcic)
Wacław Rzewuski (1705–1779), Polish drama writer and poet as well as a military commander

Places:
Stare Rzewuski, large village in Gmina Przesmyki, Siedlce County, Masovian Voivodeship, Poland

Families:
 Rzewuski family (nobility)